Zaferia is a neighborhood in the eastern part of Long Beach, California.  It corresponds to the area around Anaheim Street and Redondo Avenue.  It was founded as a small town, and shortly thereafter was served by the Pacific Electric Railway's Balboa Line, which had a station named "Zaferia" near Anaheim and Redondo at the junction with the 3rd Street/Redondo Avenue local.  The area cites 1913 as its date of founding; by that time, the area contained numerous businesses and even a newspaper.  It was one of a handful of "wet" cities in Los Angeles County in the 1910s.  It was annexed by Long Beach in 1920.  A park at Pacific Coast Highway and Redondo bears the name "Plaza Zaferia".

The Zaferia Business Association, formerly known as the East Anaheim Street Business Alliance, was formed in 1991.

See also
Neighborhoods of Long Beach, California
Eastside, Long Beach, California

References

External links
 East Anaheim Street Business Alliance: Historic Zaferia

Neighborhoods in Long Beach, California